List of Hungarian (or use in Hungary) locomotives — The first railway line between Szolnok–Pest–Vác was built in Hungary in 1846. Steam locomotives have been used since then. Diesel and electric locomotives appeared in the first half of the 20th century.

Railway towing vehicles have often been renumbered or scrapped over the decades. (None of the many types survive.) The list below uses the 1911 to 2010 numbering system.

It is important to note that the list does not include all locomotives that have ever been used. The reason for this is that many narrow-gauge railways also existed (partly in Hungary), and there is a serious lack of data on the locomotives used there. The history of all narrow-gauge railways in Hungary has not yet been processed (2021).

Steam locomotives 

 Although the engineer brothers Gergely Nagy and Lajos Nagy made a working steam locomotive model, name „DERÜ” (in English serenity, conviviality) already in 1845–1847, they could not sell it later, and the production of large steam locomotives did not start from the type. (The model is now owned by the Hungarian Museum of Transport. In 1875, Ferenc Bognár added a mechanical vehicle.) Hungarian steam locomotives were acquired from abroad (typically from Austrian factories) for a long time. Hungarian (MÁVAG) locomotive production did not start until the 1870s. Nevertheless, a significant number of foreign-produced locomotives still operate in the country.

Types discarded before the new 1911 numbering system

Types that existed after the new numbering system in 1911

Diesel locomotives

Electric locomotives

Narrow gauge locomotives 
For used narrow gauge locomotives, see: kisvasut.hu

The list above nevertheless includes steam locomotives designed for narrow gauge.

Interesting 
 Several steam locomotives are still in use on the Banovic Coal Mine line (Bosnia and Herzegovina) today. Several of them may be made in Hungary. In Bosnia and Herzegovina, several other steam locomotives are used, which may also be of Hungarian origin (or the type used in the list above).

Preserved steam locomotives 
Although not all types of diesel and electric locomotives (no longer in use today) have been preserved, most of them are visible specimens. This is not the case for steam locomotives used in Hungary. There were a number of types (see list above) that were not left to fend for themselves. Of the (approximately) 140 types at that time – according to József Soltész, a train expert at the Museum of Transport (2009) – „ten thousand steam locomotives ran in the country, and now one hundred and fifty of them have been preserved.” Of these, barely 25 are operational.

 List of steam locomotives remaining in Hungary

Locomotive museums in Hungary, storage locations 

 Hungarian Technical and Transportation Museum, Budapest (under construction)
 Hungarian Railway History Park, Budapest
 Urban Public Transport Museum, Szentendre
 Railway Main Workshop in Istvántelek, Budapest
 issued some specimens at railway stations
 in railway repair halls

Other places of use 
 in use on normal gauge lines (steam locomotives only as a nostalgia)
 in use on narrow gauge lines (steam locomotives only as a nostalgia, there is no electric locomotive in such a place)

References

Sources 

 MÁV steam locomotives

Literature 
 A magyar keskeny nyomtávolságú gőzmozdonygyártás helye, szerepe a magyar ipar történetében
 Soltész József: A Magyar Középponti Vasút első mozdonyai. In: A Közlekedési Múzeum Évkönyve 13. 2001–2002. Budapest, 2003.
 Czére Béla: A magyar vasút képekben, Magyar Államvasutak, Budapest, 1972
 Villányi György. Gőzmotorkocsik és kismozdonyok. Magyar Államvasutak Rt. (1996)
 Villányi György. A Magyar Államvasutak vontatójárműveinek jelölési- és pályaszámrendszerei, Vasúthistória Évkönyv. Közlekedési Dokumentációs Vállalat. ISSN 0238-6550 (2003)
 Lányi Ernő, Lovász István, Mohay László, Szontágh Gáspár, Villányi György. Nagyvasúti Vontatójárművek Magyarországon. Közlekedési Dokumentációs Vállalat (1984). ISBN 963-552-161-8
 Mezei István, Lovas József. MÁV Vontatójármű Album 1868-1993. KÖZDOK (1994). ISBN 963-552-289-4
 Magyar Vasúttörténet I–VII. Közlekedési Dokumentációs Kft., Budapest, 1995–1999 ISBN 963-552-311-4 
 Pottyondy Tihamér: A magyar államvasutak mozdonyparkja, mozdonyainak szerkezeti fejlődése és a modern mozdonytipusok. A magyar államvasutak gépészeti műszaki közlései. Kézirat, 1918. november.
 Fialovits Béla: A M.Á.V. gőzmozdonyainak történeti fejlődése X. Technika 1943. 
 Mezei István. Mozdonyok, Móra Könyvkiadó, Budapest, 1984, ISBN 963-11376-3-5
 Heller György: Magyar Vasúttörténeti Park született! Egy, évtizedeken át folytatott küzdelem története, Magyar Államvasutak Részvénytársaság, Budapest, 2000, ISBN 963-00-3100-0
 Holcsik Ferenc – Villányi György: Magyar Vasúttörténeti Park, Magyar Államvasutak Részvénytársaság, Budapest, 2002, ISBN 963-7085-80-7
 25 éves a MÁV História Bizottsága – 10 éves a Magyar Vasúttörténeti Park Alapítvány / A MÁV História Bizottság kibővített, ünnepélyes ülése, Magyar Vasúttörténeti Park, 2009. október 8., Magyar Vasúttörténeti Park Alapítvány, Budapest, 2009
 (szerk.) Kovács László: Magyar vasúttörténet 1846-2000, Magyar Államvasutak Részvénytársaság, Budapest, 2000, ISBN 963-03-8369-1
 Urbán Lajos: Vasúti nagylexikon I-II., MÁV RT., 2005, ISBN 9632041216
 (szerk.) Mezei István: 150 éves a magyar vasút 1846-1996, MÁV Rt., Budapest, 1996
 Magyarország mozdonyai, Indóház Lap- és Könyvkiadó, Budapest, 2007, ISBN 978-963-06-3174-7

Hungarian journals dealing with locomotives 

 Indóház (iho.hu)
 Vasút
 Vasútvilág
 Vasutasvilág
 Vasutas Magazin
 Vasutas Hírlap
 Vasút & Modell
 A vasút világa
 Vasútgépészet
 Magyar vasutas
 MÁV almanach
 Sínek Világa
 Pályaőr
 A Magyar Államvasutak Hivatalos Lapja
 A Magyar Államvasutak Rt. Értesítője

Railway locomotive-related lists
Locomotives of Hungary